Bill Johnston defeated Frank Hunter 6–0, 6–3, 6–1 in the final to win the gentlemen's singles tennis title at the 1923 Wimbledon Championships. The field consisted of 133 players and a preliminary round of five matches was held to bring the total down to a 128 men draw. Gerald Patterson was the defending champion, but did not participate.

Draw

Finals

Top half

Section 1

Section 2

Section 3

Section 4

Bottom half

Section 5

Section 6

Section 7

Section 8

Preliminary round

Notes

References

External links

Men's Singles
Wimbledon Championship by year – Men's singles